An adverbial clause is a dependent clause that functions as an adverb. That is, the entire clause modifies a separate element within a sentence. As with all clauses, it contains a subject and predicate, though the subject as well as the (predicate) verb are omitted and implied if the clause is reduced to an adverbial phrase as discussed below.

Adverbial clause versus adverbial phrase

Adverbial clauses
An adverbial clause begins with a subordinating conjunction—sometimes called a trigger word. In the examples below, the adverbial clause is italicized and the subordinating conjunction is bolded:
Mary, the aspiring actress, became upset as soon as she saw the casting list.
(subject: she; predicate: saw the casting list; the clause modifies the verb became)
Peter, the drama teacher, met with Mary after she calmed down.
(explicit subject: she; predicate: calmed down; predicate (verb): calmed; the clause modifies the verb met)
We left before the speeches ended.
(adverbial clause; contains subject and predicate)
According to Sidney Greenbaum and Randolph Quirk (Greenbaum and Quirk, 1990), adverbial clauses function mainly as adverbial adjuncts or disjuncts but differ in syntax from adverbial phrases and adverbial prepositional phrases, as indicated below.

Adverbial phrases

Unlike adverbial clauses, adverbial phrases contain neither an explicit subject nor a predicate. In the examples below, the adverbial phrase is italicized and the adposition is bolded:
Mary, the aspiring actress, became upset as one of the casting list rejects.
Peter, the drama teacher, met with Mary after seeing her disappointment.
We left before the speeches.

Types

Adverbial clauses are divided into several groups according to the actions or senses of their conjunctions:

See also
Temporal clause (Latin)

References

Further reading

 Greenbaum, Sidney & Quirk, Randolph. A Student's Grammar of the English Language. Hong Kong: Longman Group (FE) Ltd, 1990.
 Sinclair, John (editor-in-chief). Collins Cobuild English Grammar. London and Glasgow: William Collins Sons & Co ltd, 1990.

External links
 Adverb Clause
 How to Use Adverb Clauses

Grammar

Syntactic categories